Mali competed at the 1980 Summer Olympics in Moscow, USSR.  The nation returned to the Olympic Games after boycotting the 1976 Summer Olympics.

Results by event

Athletics
Men's Discus Throw
 Namakoro Niare
 Qualification — 57.34 m (→ did not advance, 15th place)

Women's 800 metres
 Fatalmoudou Touré
 Heat — 2:19.8 (→ did not advance)

Boxing
Men's Bantamweight (54 kg)
 Moussa Sangare
 First Round — Lost to Lucky Mutale (Zambia) on points (0-5)

References
Official Olympic Reports

Nations at the 1980 Summer Olympics
1980
Oly